The following outline is provided as an overview of and topical guide to Judaism:

History
 Origins of Judaism
 Jewish history

Pre-monarchic period
 Ugaritic mythology – The Levant region was inhabited by people who themselves referred to the land as "ca-na-na-um" as early as the mid-third millennium BCE
 Ancient semitic religions – The term ancient Semitic religion encompasses the polytheistic religions of the Semitic speaking peoples of the ancient Near East and Northeast Africa. Its origins are intertwined with Mesopotamian mythology.
 El (deity) – the supreme god of the Canaanite religion and the supreme god of the Mesopotamian Semites in the pre-Sargonic period.
 Elyon – "God Most High"
 El Shaddai – "God Almighty"
 Elohim – a grammatically singular or plural noun for "god" or "gods" in both modern and ancient Hebrew language.
 Asherah – a Semitic mother goddess, the wife or consort of the Sumerian Anu or Ugaritic El, the oldest deities of their pantheons
 Baal –  a Northwest Semitic title and honorific meaning "master" or "lord" that is used for various gods who were patrons of cities in the Levant and Asia Minor
 Yahweh – the national god of the Iron Age kingdoms of Israel (Samaria) and Judah.
 Tetragrammaton – YHWH

Monarchic period

United monarchy

 King Saul – the first king of the united Kingdom of Israel.
 Ish-bosheth – the second king of the united Kingdom
 King David – the third king of the United Kingdom of Israel
 King Solomon – the final king before the northern Kingdom of Israel and the southern Kingdom of Judah
 Solomon's Temple – the First Temple, was the main temple in ancient Jerusalem, on the Temple Mount (also known as Mount Zion), before its destruction by Nebuchadnezzar II after the Siege of Jerusalem of 587 BCE.
Further information:
 Tel Dan Stele –  a stele (inscribed stone) discovered in 1993/94 during excavations at Tel Dan in northern Israel.
 Mesha Stele –  a black basalt stone bearing an inscription by the 9th century BC ruler Mesha of Moab in Jordan.

Divided monarchy
 History of ancient Israel and Judah

Kingdom of Judah

Kings of Judah

 Rehoboam
 Abijah
 Asa
 Jehoshaphat
 Jehoram
 Ahaziah
 Athaliah
 J(eh)oash
 Amaziah
 Uzziah/Azariah
 Jotham
 Ahaz
 Hezekiah
 Manasseh
 Amon
 Josiah
 Jehoahaz
 Jehoiakim
 Jeconiah/Jehoiachin
 Zedekiah

Major events
 Babylonian captivity

Further information:
 Jeremiah

Kingdom of Israel

Kings of Israel

House of Jeroboam
 Jeroboam I
 Nadab
House of Baasha
 Baasha
 Elah
House of Zimri
 Zimri
House of Omri
 Omri
 Ahab
 Ahaziah
 Joram
House of Jehu
 Jehu
 Jehoahaz
 Jehoash(Joash)
 Jeroboam II
 Zachariah
House of Shallum
 Shallum
House of Menahem
 Menahem
 Pekahiah
House of Pekah
 Pekah
House of Hoshea
 Hoshea

Major events
 Assyrian captivity – 720 BC
 Ten Lost Tribes

Return from captivity
 Cyrus's edict
 Ezra
 Nehemiah
 Second Temple Judaism
 Hellenistic Judaism
 Hasmonean dynasty

Development of Rabbinic Judaism

 Jerusalem
 Temple in Jerusalem
 Jerusalem in Judaism
 Timeline of Jerusalem
 Herod
 Sanhedrin
 Pharisees
 Sadducees
 Essenes
 Jewish–Roman wars
 First Jewish–Roman War
 Kitos War
 Bar Kokhba revolt
 Diaspora
 Middle Ages
 Muslim rule
 Haskalah
 Emancipation
 The Holocaust
 Aliyah
 History of Zionism
 History of Israel
 Land of Israel

Sacred texts

Written Torah
 Tanakh
 Torah
 Chumash–a Torah in printed form
 Nevi'im
 Ketuvim

Oral Torah

Oral Torah
Talmud (as encompassing the main Oral Law)
Jerusalem Talmud
Babylonian Talmud
Mishnah, the first major written redaction of the Jewish oral traditions known as the "Oral Torah".
Gemara, rabbinical analysis of and commentary on the Mishnah
Aggadah, a compendium of rabbinic texts that incorporates folklore, historical anecdotes, moral exhortations, and practical advice in various spheres, from business to medicine.
Tosefta, a compilation of the Jewish oral law from the late 2nd century, the period of the Mishnah
Midrash, the genre of rabbinic literature which contains early interpretations and commentaries on the Written Torah and Oral Torah (spoken law and sermons), as well as non-legalistic rabbinic literature (aggadah) and occasionally the Jewish religious laws (halakha), which usually form a running commentary on specific passages in the Hebrew Scripture (Tanakh).[2]
Midrash halakha
Mussar
Geonim, presidents of the two great Babylonian, Talmudic Academies of Sura and Pumbedita, in the Abbasid Caliphate, and generally accepted spiritual leaders of the Jewish community worldwide in the early medieval era
Rishonim, the leading rabbis and poskim who lived approximately during the 11th to 15th centuries, in the era before the writing of the Shulchan Aruch (Hebrew: שׁוּלחָן עָרוּך, "Set Table", a common printed code of Jewish law, 1563 CE) and following the Geonim (589–1038 CE)
Acharonim, the leading rabbis and poskim (Jewish legal decisors) living from roughly the 16th century to the present, and more specifically since the writing of the Shulchan Aruch (Hebrew: שׁוּלחָן עָרוּך, "Set Table", a code of Jewish law) in 1563 CE.

Rabbinic literature
Rabbinic literature, in its broadest sense, can mean the entire spectrum of rabbinic writings throughout Jewish history. But the term often refers specifically to literature from the Talmudic era, as opposed to medieval and modern rabbinic writing, and thus corresponds with the Hebrew term Sifrut Hazal (ספרות חז"ל; "Literature [of our] sages [of] blessed memory," where Hazal normally refers only to the sages of the Talmudic era). This more specific sense of "Rabbinic literature"—referring to the Talmudim, Midrash, and related writings, but hardly ever to later texts—is how the term is generally intended when used in contemporary academic writing. On the other hand, the terms meforshim and parshanim (commentaries/commentators) almost always refer to later, post-Talmudic writers of Rabbinic glosses on Biblical and Talmudic texts.

Mishnaic literature
The Mishnah and the Tosefta (compiled from materials pre-dating the year 200) are the earliest extant works of rabbinic literature, expounding and developing Judaism's Oral Law, as well as ethical teachings.   Following these came the two Talmuds:
The Jerusalem Talmud, c. 450
The Babylonian Talmud, c. 600
The minor tractates (part of the Babylonian Talmud)

The Midrash
The midrash is the genre of rabbinic literature which contains early interpretations and commentaries on the Written Torah and Oral Torah, as well as non-legalistic rabbinic literature and occasionally the Jewish religious laws, which usually form a running commentary on specific passages in the Tanakh. The term midrash also can refer to a compilation of Midrashic teachings, in the form of legal, exegetical, homiletical, or narrative writing, often configured as a commentary on the Bible or Mishnah.

Later works by category

Major codes of Jewish law
Halakha
 Mishneh Torah
 Arba'ah Turim
 Shulchan Aruch
 Beit Yosef
 Chayei Adam
 The Responsa literature

Jewish thought, mysticism and ethics
 Aggadah:
 Aggadic Midrashim
 Ein Yaakov
 Jewish philosophy:
 Philo
 Isaac Israeli
 Emunot v'Dayyot
 Guide to the Perplexed
 Bachya ibn Pakuda
 Sefer ha-Ikkarim Book of the Wars of the Lord
 Or Adonai
 Jewish mysticism and Kabbalah:
 Kabbalah: Primary texts
 Sepher Yetzirah
 Bahir
 Zohar
 Sefer Raziel HaMalakh
 Pardes Rimonim
 Etz Hayim
 The works of Hasidic Judaism:
 The Tanya (Likutei Amarim)
 Likutey Moharan
 Shem Mishmuel
 Tzavaat HaRivash
 Musar literature:
 Mesillat Yesharim
 Shaarei Teshuva
 Orchot Tzaddikim
 Sefer Chasidim
 The Lonely Man of Faith

Liturgy
The Siddur and Jewish liturgyPiyyutim (Classical Jewish poetry)

Later rabbinic works by historical period

Works of the Geonim
The Geonim are the rabbis of Sura and Pumbeditha, in Babylon (650–1250) :She'iltoth of Achai GaonHalachoth GedolothEmunoth ve-Deoth (Saadia Gaon)
The Siddur by Amram Gaon
Responsa

Works of the Rishonim (the "early" rabbinical commentators)

The Rishonim are the rabbis of the early medieval period (1000–1550), such as the following main examples:
The commentaries on the Torah, such as those by Rashi, Abraham ibn Ezra and Nahmanides.
Commentaries on the Talmud, principally by Rashi, his grandson Samuel ben Meir and Nissim of Gerona.
Talmudic novellae (chiddushim) by Tosafists, Nahmanides, Nissim of Gerona, Solomon ben Aderet (RaShBA), Yomtov ben Ashbili (Ritva)
Works of halakha (Asher ben Yechiel, Mordechai ben Hillel)
Codices by Maimonides and Jacob ben Asher, and finally Shulkhan ArukhLegal responsa, e.g. by Solomon ben Aderet (RaShBA)
Jewish philosophical rationalist works (Maimonides, Gersonides etc.)
Kabbalistic mystical works (such as the Zohar)
Mussar literature ethical works (Bahya ibn Paquda, Jonah of Gerona)

Works of the Acharonim (the "later" rabbinical commentators)

The Acharonim are the rabbis from 1550 to the present day, such as the following main examples:
Important Torah commentaries include Keli Yakar (Shlomo Ephraim Luntschitz), Ohr ha-Chayim by Chayim ben-Attar, the commentary of Samson Raphael Hirsch, and the commentary of Naftali Zvi Yehuda Berlin
Important works of Talmudic novellae include: Pnei Yehoshua, Hafla'ah, Sha'agath AryeiCodices of halakha e.g. for Sephardim: Ben Ish Hai by Yosef Hayyim, Kaf ha-Ḥayim by Yaakov Chaim Sofer and the Yalkut Yosef ;  for Ashkenazim: Mishnah Berurah by Yisrael Meir Kagan and the Aruch ha-Shulchan by Yechiel Michel Epstein
Legal responsa, e.g. by Moses Sofer, Moshe Feinstein
Kabbalistic mystical commentaries
Philosophical/metaphysical works (the works of the Maharal of Prague, Moshe Chaim Luzzatto and Nefesh ha-Chayim by Chaim of Volozhin)
Hasidic works (Kedushath Levi, Sefath Emmeth, Shem mi-Shemuel)
Mussar literature ethical works: Moshe Chaim Luzzatto, Yisrael Meir Kagan and the Mussar Movement
Historical works, e.g. Shem ha-Gedolim by Chaim Joseph David Azulai.

MeforshimMeforshim is a Hebrew word meaning "(classical rabbinical) commentators" (or roughly meaning "exegetes"), and is used as a substitute for the correct word perushim which means "commentaries". In Judaism this term refers to commentaries on the Torah (five books of Moses), Tanakh, the Mishnah, the Talmud, responsa, even the siddur (Jewish prayerbook), and more.

Classic Torah and Talmud commentaries
Classic Torah and/or Talmud commentaries have been written by the following individuals:
 Geonim
 Saadia Gaon, 10th century Babylon
 Rishonim
 Rashi (Shlomo Yitzchaki), 12th century France
 Abraham ibn Ezra
 Nachmanides (Moshe ben Nahman)
 Samuel ben Meir, the Rashbam, 12th century France
 Levi ben Gershom (known as Ralbag or Gersonides)
 David Kimhi, 13th century France
 Joseph ben Isaac Bekhor Shor, 12th century France
 Nissim of Gerona, the RaN, 14th century Spain
 Isaac Abarbanel (1437–1508)
 Obadiah ben Jacob Sforno, 16th century Italy
 Acharonim
 The Vilna Gaon, Rabbi Eliyahu of Vilna, 18th century Lithuania
 The Malbim, Meir Leibush ben Yehiel Michel Wisser

Classical Talmudic commentaries were written by Rashi. After Rashi the Tosafot were written, which was an omnibus commentary on the Talmud by the disciples and descendants of Rashi; this commentary was based on discussions done in the rabbinic academies of Germany and France.

Branches and denominations

 Sadducees (In Second Temple times)
Hellenistic Judaism
Karaite Judaism
Sabbateans
Rabbinic Judaism
Pharisees (In Second Temple times)
Orthodox Judaism
Misnagdim
Modern Orthodox Judaism
Haredi Judaism (including Hasidic Judaism)
Hardal
Neturei Karta
Conservative (Masorti) Judaism
Reform Judaism
 New Religious Movement
Reconstructionist Judaism
Jewish Renewal
Humanistic Judaism
Neolog Judaism
Jewish Science
Messianic Judaism (regarded by virtually all mainstream Jewish denominations as a Christian group)
Black Judaism
Frankism
Religious Zionism (Interdenominational)

Behavior and experience
 Jew (word)
 Who is a Jew?
 Bar and Bat Mitzvah
 Bereavement
 Brit milah (Circumcision)
 Hatafat dam brit
 Cuisine
 Marriage
 Menstruation
 Minyan
 Pidyon haben (Redemption of a firstborn son)
 Shidduch (Matchmaking)
 Zeved habat'' (Naming ceremony for newborn girls)
 Wedding

Holy days and observances
 Jewish holidays
 Jewish and Israeli holidays 2000–2050
 Shabbat
Major
 Passover
 Shavuot
 Rosh Hashanah
 Yom Kippur
 Sukkot
 Simchat Torah
 Shemini Atzeret
 Rosh Chodesh

Minor
 Purim
 Hanukkah
 Yom Ha'atzmaut
Fast days
 Seventeenth of Tammuz
 Tisha B'Av
 Fast of Esther
 Fast of Gedalia

Belief and doctrine
 Monotheism
 Philosophy
 Principles of faith
 Chosen people
 Eschatology
 :Category:Jewish eschatology
 Armilus
 Atchalta De'Geulah
 Gathering of Israel
 Gog and Magog
 Jewish messianism
 Year 6000
 Messiah ben Joseph
 Messiah ben David
 The Messiah at the Gates of Rome
 Jewish ethics
 Chillul Hashem
 Geneivat da'at
 Kiddush Hashem
 Lashon hara
 Lifnei iver
 Retzach
 Holocaust theology
 Tzedakah
 Tzniut
 Shatnez

Law
 Halakha
 613 Mitzvot
 Seven Laws of Noah
 Ten Commandments

Major legal codes and works
 Midrash halakha
 Arba'ah Turim and Shulchan Aruch
 Orach Chayim
 Yoreh De'ah
 Even Ha'ezer
 Choshen Mishpat
 Mishneh Torah
 Sefer Hamitzvot
 Shulchan Aruch HaRav
 Chayei Adam
 Kitzur Shulchan Aruch
 Mishnah Berurah
 Aruch HaShulchan

Examples of legal principles
 Aveira
 Bemeizid
 B'rov am hadrat melech
 Chumra
 D'Oraita and D'Rabbanan
 Mitzvah goreret mitzvah
 Ikar v'tafel
 Neder
 Osek b'mitzvah patur min hamitzvah
 Pikuach nefesh
 Positive time-bound mitzvot
 Self-sacrifice in Jewish law
 Shomea k'oneh
 Toch k'dei dibur
 Yad soledet bo

Examples of Biblical punishments
 Capital punishment
 Kareth
 Stoning

Dietary laws and customs
Kashrut
Kosher animals
Kosher fish list
Kosher foods
Kosher wine
Mashgiach
Milk and meat in Jewish law
Slaughter
Hechsher
Vegetarianism

Names of God

 :Category:Tetragrammaton
 Shem HaMephorash
 Ancient of Days
 El
 El Roi
 El Shaddai
 Elohim
 I Am that I Am
 Shaddai

Mysticism and the esoteric
 :Category:Jewish mysticism
 :Category:Jewish mystical texts
 Kabbalah
 :Category:Kabbalah
 :Category:Kabbalah texts
 :Category:Kabbalists
 Timeline List of Jewish Kabbalists
 :Category:Practical Kabbalah
 :Category:Kabbalistic words and phrases
 Ein Sof
 Ohr
 :Category:Qliphoth
 :Category:Four Worlds
 Atziluth
 Beri'ah
 Yetzirah
 Assiah
 :Category:Sephirot
 Keter
 Chokhmah
 Binah
 Da'at
 Chesed
 Gevurah
 Tiferet
 Netzach
 Hod
 Yesod
 Malkuth
 :Category:Angels in Judaism
 Kabbalistic angelic hierarchy
 :Category:Kabbalah stubs

Religious articles and prayers
Aleinu
Amidah
Four Species
Gartel
Hallel
Havdalah
Kaddish
Kittel
Kol Nidre
Ma Tovu
Menorah
Hanukiah
Mezuzah
Prayers
Sefer Torah
Services
Shema Yisrael
Shofar
Tallit
Tefillin
Tzitzit
Yad
Kippah/Yarmulke

Conversion
 Conversion to Judaism
 Tevilah
 Mikveh
 :Category:Converts to Judaism
 :Category:Converts to Judaism from atheism or agnosticism
 :Category:Converts to Judaism from Christianity
 :Category:Converts to Judaism from Islam
 :Category:Converts to Judaism from Oriental Orthodoxy
 :Category:Groups who converted to Judaism

Return to Judaism
 Who is a Jew?
 Baal teshuva
 Baal teshuva movement
 :Category:Baalei teshuva institutions
 :Category:Conservative Judaism outreach
 :Category:Orthodox Jewish outreach
 :Category:Reform Judaism outreach
 Atonement in Judaism
 Confession in Judaism
 Repentance in Judaism

Apostasy
 Apostasy in Judaism
 Epikoros
 Ex-Haredim (Yetzia bish'eila)
 Haskalah
 Heresy in Judaism
 Heresy in Orthodox Judaism
 Jewish anarchism
 Jewish atheism
 :Category:Jewish agnostics
 :Category:Jewish atheists
 List of former Jews
 Jewish schisms
 Jewish secularism
 Secularism in Israel
 :Category:Secular Jewish culture
 :Category:Converts from Judaism
 :Category:Jewish agnostics
 :Category:Jewish atheists
 :Category:Converts to Christianity from Judaism
 :Category:Converts to Islam from Judaism

Interactions with other religions and cultures
 Abrahamic religions
 Black Hebrew Israelites
 Christianity and Judaism
 Catholic Church and Judaism
 Christian–Jewish reconciliation
 Judaism and Mormonism
 Messianic Judaism
 Islamic–Jewish relations
 Jewish Buddhist
 Jewish views on religious pluralism
 Semitic neopaganism

References

External links 

 
Judaism
Judaism